The Vaisha Dev Shrine, also known as Toothache tree, is a wooden log at Bangemudha, Kathmandu.

Background 
The shrine is dedicated to goddess Vaisha Dev who is a Newar's patron saint of toothache. People suffering from toothache visit the shrine to nail Nepalese rupee coins believing in that it will get rid of the toothache. The log contains thousands of coins nailed into it. It attracts many people who have toothache due to this dentist's have opened shop near the shrine. There are also "healers" who claim to cure them by offering them money, or other gifts including fruits.

References 

Religious buildings and structures in Nepal
Buildings and structures in Kathmandu